The Alliance of Community Television Austria ( or VCFÖ) is the alliance and lobbying group of non-commercial community television stations in Austria. The VCFÖ was established in 2010 as an association and has three members. The acceptance of the "Charta Community Television Austria" is mandatory for the membership.

The VCFÖ is affiliated to the Alliance Community Radio Austria, the Community Media Forum Europe and the World Association of Community Radio Broadcasters.

Members 
Full members are:
 dorf (Linz)
 FS1 (Salzburg)
 Okto (Vienna)

See also 
 Alliance for Community Media (United States)
 Community Media Association (UK)

References

External links 
 VCFÖ - Webpage of the organization at FS1 (in German)

Cultural organisations based in Austria
Non-profit organisations based in Austria
Community television
Freedom of expression organizations